The Tschingel Glacier is a 3 km long glacier (2005) situated in the Bernese Alps in the canton of Berne in Switzerland. In 1973 it had an area of 6.19 km².

See also
List of glaciers in Switzerland
Swiss Alps

External links
Swiss glacier monitoring network

Glaciers of the canton of Bern
Glaciers of the Alps
GTschingel